Hans Kindler (born 30 May 1902, date of death unknown) was a Swiss athlete. He competed in the men's long jump at the 1920 Summer Olympics.

References

1902 births
Year of death missing
Athletes (track and field) at the 1920 Summer Olympics
Swiss male long jumpers
Olympic athletes of Switzerland
Place of birth missing